Saleh Mohammed Al-Arfej (born August 1, 1994) is a Saudi footballer who plays as a forward.

External links 
 

1994 births
Living people
Saudi Arabian footballers
Hajer FC players
Al Omran Club players
Association football forwards
Saudi First Division League players
Saudi Professional League players
Saudi Second Division players
Saudi Third Division players